Samuel Różycki (1781–1834) was an officer in the Polish Legions of the Napoleonic period, then in the army of the Duchy of Warsaw and later of Congress Poland. 

He joined the insurgents during the November Uprising and was one of its generals. He emigrated after its failure, first to France, then to Switzerland (he died in Bern).

He was awarded the Gold Cross of the Virtuti Militari, Cavalier of the Legion of Honour, Order of St. Stanislaus.

1781 births
1834 deaths
Polish generals
Recipients of the Gold Cross of the Virtuti Militari
Chevaliers of the Légion d'honneur
Generals of the November Uprising